Emmanuel Apea, Jr. is a Ghanaian TV and film director, 2008 winner of the Africa Movie Academy Award for Best Director.

Early life
Emmanuel Apea is the son of Reverend Emmanuel Apea Snr,  a former United Nations Ambassador and Co-ordinator to West Africa and ECOWAS and Emma Apea, a Healthcare practitioner. He studied at Achimota School, the University of London in the United Kingdom and Niagara College in Canada. He started out directing a series of popular TV serialized dramas. He was the first director of Taxi Driver in 1998, and the producer of the soap opera Home Sweet Home which began airing in 2003. Hotel St. James, set in Kumasi and in a mix of Akan and English, began airing in 2005.

Apea's 2006 movie Run Baby Run won four Africa Movie Academy Awards in 2008, with Apea winning the Award for Best Director. A 2010 movie, Elmina, attracted critical attention.

Filmography
 Run Baby Run, 2006
 Elmina, 2010

References

Year of birth missing (living people)
Living people
Ghanaian film directors
Ghanaian television directors
Alumni of Achimota School
Alumni of the University of London